Captain Thomas James (1593–1635) was a Welsh sea captain, notable as a navigator and explorer, who set out to discover the Northwest Passage, the hoped for ocean route around the top of North America to Asia.

James left Bristol in May 1631 on Henrietta Maria, took a month to pass Hudson Strait, was blocked by ice from going north, went west, met Luke Foxe on 29 July, reached land near Churchill, Manitoba on 11 August, went southeast to the entrance of James Bay at Cape Henrietta Maria (which James named after the wife of King Charles I), went down the west shore of James Bay and in October chose Charlton Island as a wintering post. On 29 November the ship was deliberately sunk to keep her from being swept away or crushed by ice. The ship was refloated in June. He left of 1 July 1632, took 3 weeks to exit James Bay, worked his way north through ice, reached the mouth of Hudson Strait, went north into Foxe Channel only to 65°30', turned back and reached Bristol on 22 October in a vessel that was barely seaworthy.

He named the southern coast of Hudson Bay the "New Principality of South Wales", after his native land. James' harrowing experiences during his voyage, in which he repeatedly came close to death in the ice of the Arctic Ocean, are recounted in his published account of the voyage, The Strange and Dangerous Voyage of Captaine Thomas James, published in 1633.

Some critics have opined that Samuel Taylor Coleridge's work The Rime of the Ancient Mariner was inspired by James' experience in the Arctic.

Contemporary accounts

References

External links

Internet Archive .pdf of The Strange and Dangerous Voyage of Captaine Thomas James, First Edition
Google Books scan of The Strange and Dangerous Voyage of Captain Thomas James, in "The Voyages of Captain Luke Foxe and Captain Thomas James"

Welsh explorers
Explorers of the Arctic
1593 births
1635 deaths